Chemidex Pharma is a British pharmaceutical manufacturer, owned by Navin Engineer and his wife Varsha Engineer, and based in Egham.

The company was founded in 1981.

According to the Sunday Times, the business is valued at £1 billion.

External links
 Official website

References

Companies based in Surrey
Pharmaceutical companies established in 1981